The Deming Prize is the longest-running and one of the highest awards on TQM (Total Quality Management) in the world. It recognizes both individuals for their contributions to the field of Total Quality Management (TQM) and businesses that have successfully implemented TQM. It was established in 1951 to honor W. Edwards Deming who contributed greatly to Japan’s proliferation of statistical quality control after World War II. His teachings helped Japan build its foundation by which the level of Japan’s product quality has been recognized as the highest in the world, was originally designed to reward Japanese companies for major advances in quality improvement. Over the years it has grown, under the guidance of the Japanese Union of Scientists and Engineers (JUSE) to where it is now also available to non-Japanese companies, albeit usually operating in Japan, and also to individuals recognized as having made major contributions to the advancement of quality. The awards ceremony is broadcast every year in Japan on national television.

Two categories of awards are made annually, the Deming Prize for Individuals and the Deming Prize.

Winners of individual award

 1951: Motosaburo Masuyama
 1952: Tetsuichi Asaka, Kaoru Ishikawa, Masao Kogure, Masao Goto, Hidehiko Higashi, Shin Miura, Shigeru Mizuno, Eizo Watanabe
 1953: Toshio Kitagawa
 1954: Eizaburo Nishibori
 1988: Renichi Takenaka
 1989: Hitoshi Kume
 1990: Shoichiro Kobayashi
 1991: Kenji Kurogane
 1992: Masao Nemoto
 1993: Yasutoshi Washio
 1994: Takanori Yoneyama
 1995: Ayatomo Kanno
 1996: Kenzo Sasaoka
 1997: Noriaki Kano
 1998: Katsuya Hosotani
 1999: Yotaro Kobayashi
 2000: Matabee Maeda
 2001: Shiro Fujita
 2002: Shoji Shiba
 2003: Tadashi Yoshizawa
 2004: Akira Takahashi
 2005: Hajime Sasaki
 2006: Yoshinori Iizuka
 2007: Masayoshi Ushikubo
 2008: Masahiro Sakane
 2009: Hiroshi Osada
 2010: Takao Enkawa
 2011: Masamitsu Sakurai
 2012: Makoto Nakao
 2013: Hideo Iwasaki
 2014: Kazuyuki Suzuki
 2015: Tadaaki Jagawa
 2016: Naotake Okubo
 2017: Takeshi Nakajo
 2018: Kunihiko Onuma
 2019: Yasushi Nagata
 2020: Shinichi Sasaki
 2021: Hiroe Tsubaki

Winners of application prize
1951
 Fuji Iron & Steel Co., Ltd. (now part of Nippon Steel)
 Showa Denko K.K.
 Tanabe Seiyaku Co., Ltd.
 Yawata Iron & Steel Co., Ltd (now part of Nippon Steel)
 1958
 Kaneka Corporation
1961
Denso Japan
1965 
 Toyota Motor Corp. 
 1976
Pentel Co., Ltd. "(a first for the stationery industry)".
1979 
 Takenaka Corporation "(a first for non-manufacturer industry)".
 1981
 JUKI Corporation (Tokyo Juki Industrial Co., Ltd., Industrial Sewing Machine Division) 
 1989
 Florida Power & Light (first non-Japanese winner of award)
 1994
Lucent Technologies, Power Systems (first American manufacturer to win award)
 1998
Sundaram Clayton brakes division

 2002
 TVS Motor Company (TVSMC)
 Hi-Tech Carbon GMPD

 2003
 Brakes India Ltd., Foundry Division [India]
 Mahindra & Mahindra Ltd. (the world's first tractor company to win)
Rane Brake Lining Ltd.
 Sona Koyo Steering Systems Ltd.

 2004
 Indo Gulf Fertilisers Ltd.
 Lucas TVS Ltd.
 SRF limited

 2005
 Rane Engine Valve Ltd
 Rane TRW Steering Systems Ltd.(SGD)
 Krishna Maruti Ltd., Seat Division

 2006
Sanden International (Singapore) Pte Ltd (SIS), the first Singapore-based/branch company to win.
 2007
 Rane (Madras) Ltd.
 AIS Auto Glass

 2008
 Tata Steel, the first integrated steel plant in Asia to win Deming award
 2010
 National Engineering Industries Ltd, part of the 150-year-old, Indian multi-billion CK Birla Group. NEI is the second bearing company in the world after NTN Corporation, Japan to win this coveted award. Mr Rohit Saboo ( President & CEO ) received the award in a glittering ceremony in Osaka, Japan.

2011
 Sanden Vikas (India) Limited, (India)

2012
 SRF Limited, Chemicals Business (India); Mr. Roop Salotra, President and CEO
 Mahindra & Mahindra Limited, Farm Equipment Sector, Swaraj Division (India); Mr. Bishwambhar Mishra, Chief Executive

2013
 RSB Transmissions(I) Limited, Auto Division (Jamshedpur(Unit 1), Pune & Pant Nagar Plant) (India)
2014
 GC America (USA)
 Yaskawa
 Mahindra Powerol

2016
Ashok Leyland, Pantnagar plant - World's first commercial vehicle to get the Deming Prize (Outside Japan)
2017
Ashok Leyland Limited, Hosur Unit II, India
CEAT Limited, India [first tire company in the world (Outside Japan) to get Deming award]

2018
PT Komatsu Indonesia [First Company in Indonesia, to get the Deming Prize; Mr. Pratjojo Dewo, President Director]
Sundram Fasteners Limited, India [SFL got the Deming Prize for all its 17 plants located across India; Arathi Krishna, Managing Director, is the first woman to receive this award]
Jsw Steel Ltd, India [President, Mr. Rajashekhar Pattanasetty]
Indus Towers, India [CEO: Bimal Dayal]

2019
ELGi Equipments Ltd, Coimbatore, was the first industrial air compressor manufacturer outside of Japan to win this award.

Deming Distinguished Service Award for Dissemination Oversea 
2009: Gregory H. Watson 
2012: Janak Mehta 
2014: Kan Trakulhoon 
2019: Venu Srinivasan

See also
European Quality Award
List of national quality awards
Malcolm Baldrige National Quality Award
Total Quality Management

References

External links
 
 The W. Edwards Deming Institute
 Union of Japanese Scientists and Engineers (JUSE)
 Toyota.com on winning the Deming Prize in 1965
 List of winners of the Deming Application Prize on JUSE web site
 Deming Medal (given to individuals by ASQ)

1950 establishments in Japan
Awards established in 1950
Japanese awards
Economics awards
Quality awards